Marquard of Randeck (or of Randelle; Italian: Marquardo di Randeck; 1296 - 3 January 1381) was Patriarch of Aquileia from 1365 until his death.

Biography
He was born at Augsburg, the son of a knight, but was educated by his uncle, the canon of the city. He was later a chancellor of emperor Charles IV at Avignon. He was appointed as prince-bishop of Augsburg in 1348. Six years later, he accompanied the emperor in his visit to Rome. The following year, Marquard was sent to Pisa to suppress an anti-imperial revolt, and was wounded in the fray. he anyway remained for a period at Pisa as imperial captain and governor in Italy. In 1356 he was captured by the condottiero Lodrisio Visconti at Casorate Primo. In 1365 the emperor made him as lieutenant general in Friuli. In the same year, pope Urban VI gave him the vacant title of Patriarch of Aquileia, and Marquard (who had to renounce Augsburg) entered at Cividale in June 1366.

Marquard received a state with numerous rebellions, such as those of Gualtiero Bertoldo IV of Spilimbergo and of the lords of Duino, and in war with Albert III and  Leopold III of Austria. Marquard was able to recover all the lost lands and to force his enemies, including also the counts of Gorizia, to peace. He then devoted himself to the traditional war against the Republic of Venice, in alliance with Louis I of Hungary, the Republic of Genoa, the dukes of Austria, the counts of Gorizia and Francesco I da Carrara, lord of Padua. The Venetians besieged Trieste: Lepold III arrived with 10,000 men, supported by a Genoese contingent, but they were crushed (5 September 1369) and the city surrendered. The Austrians left the alliance, and the remaining members were again defeated on the Piave (1372) and near Treviso (1373) by the Venetian doge Andrea Contarini, who had even hired  Turkish mercenaries.  The two parties signed a treaty of peace  on 12 September 1373.

During the War of Chioggia, the patriarch took advantage of the initial difficulties of the Venetians to invade Istria, capturing Koper and Pula. After a series of changes of possessions, Trieste was confirmed to the patriarchate at the Treaty of Turin (1381), although some territories in Istria were returned to Venice.

Marquard was a prominent jurist, and during his reign he published the Constitutiones Patriae Foriiulii , also known as Codex Marquardianus, containing the rules which regulated law in Friuli until the 18th century. He also restored the Basilica of Aquileia, damaged by an earthquake  in 1348 and rebuilt in Gothic style.

Marquard died at Trieste in January 1381.

References

1296 births
1381 deaths
Military personnel from Augsburg
Roman Catholic bishops of Augsburg
Patriarchs of Aquileia
Jurists from Bavaria